The Men's under-23 time trial of the 2016 UCI Road World Championships took place in and around in Doha, Qatar on 10 October 2016.

German riders took the first two placings, as Marco Mathis took the gold medal and rainbow jersey by 18.63 seconds ahead of fellow countryman Maximilian Schachmann, despite nearly being hit by an ambulance during his run. The bronze medal went to Australia's Miles Scotson, 19.35 seconds behind Schachmann and 37.98 seconds in arrears of the gold medal winner Mathis.

Qualification

Qualification for the event

All National Federations were allowed to enter four riders for the race, with a maximum of two riders to start. In addition to this number, the outgoing World Champion and the current continental champions were also able to take part.

Schedule
All times are in Arabia Standard Time (UTC+3).

Final classification

References

Men's under-23 time trial
UCI Road World Championships – Men's under-23 time trial